The following is an alphabetical list of topics related to the nation of Antigua and Barbuda.

0–9

.ag – Internet country code top-level domain for Antigua and Barbuda

A
Airports in Antigua and Barbuda
Ameiva griswoldi
Americas
North America
North Atlantic Ocean
West Indies
Caribbean Sea
Antilles
Lesser Antilles
Islands of Antigua and Barbuda
Anglo-America
Antigua island
Antigua and Barbuda
Antigua and Barbuda at the Olympics
Antigua Carnival
Antiguan, adjective and noun for island and nation
Antiguan British
Antiguan English
Antiguans and Barbudans
Antilles
Army of Antigua and Barbuda
Atlas of Antigua and Barbuda

B
Barbuda island
Barbudan, adjective and noun for island and nation
Barbuda Land Acts
Benna (genre)
Bibliography of Antigua and Barbuda
Lester Bird
Vere Cornwall Bird
Baldwin Spencer
Birds of Antigua and Barbuda
Burning Flames

C
Capital of Antigua and Barbuda: Saint John's on Antigua
Caribbean
Caribbean Community (CARICOM)
Caribbean Sea
James Carlisle
Categories:
:Category:Antigua and Barbuda
:Category:Antigua and Barbuda people
:Category:Antigua and Barbuda stubs
:Category:Antigua and Barbuda-related lists
:Category:Antigua and Barbuda culture
:Category:Buildings and structures in Antigua and Barbuda
:Category:Communications in Antigua and Barbuda
:Category:Economy of Antigua and Barbuda
:Category:Education in Antigua and Barbuda
:Category:Environment of Antigua and Barbuda
:Category:Geography of Antigua and Barbuda
:Category:Government of Antigua and Barbuda
:Category:Health in Antigua and Barbuda
:Category:History of Antigua and Barbuda
:Category:Law of Antigua and Barbuda
:Category:Military of Antigua and Barbuda
:Category:Politics of Antigua and Barbuda
:Category:Society of Antigua and Barbuda
:Category:Sport in Antigua and Barbuda
:Category:Transport in Antigua and Barbuda
commons:Category:Antigua and Barbuda
Coat of arms of Antigua and Barbuda
Commonwealth of Nations
Commonwealth realm of Antigua and Barbuda
Communications in Antigua and Barbuda
COVID-19 pandemic in Antigua and Barbuda
Cuisine of Antigua and Barbuda
Curtly Ambrose

D
Demographics of Antigua and Barbuda
Diplomatic missions in Antigua and Barbuda
Diplomatic missions of Antigua and Barbuda

E
Economy of Antigua and Barbuda
Education in Antigua and Barbuda
El-A-Kru
Elections in Antigua and Barbuda
Antigua and Barbuda general election, 2004
English colonization of the Americas
English language

F

"Fair Antigua, We Salute Thee"
Flag of Antigua and Barbuda
Football in Antigua and Barbuda
Football clubs in Antigua and Barbuda
Foreign relations of Antigua and Barbuda

G
Geography of Antigua and Barbuda
Government of Antigua and Barbuda
Great Bird Island, Antigua

H
History of Antigua and Barbuda

I
International Organization for Standardization (ISO)
ISO 3166-1 alpha-2 country code for Antigua and Barbuda: AG
ISO 3166-1 alpha-3 country code for Antigua and Barbuda: ATG
ISO 3166-2:AG region codes for Antigua and Barbuda
Islam in Antigua and Barbuda
Internet in Antigua and Barbuda
Islands of Antigua and Barbuda:
Antigua
Barbuda
Bird Island, Antigua and Barbuda
Bishop Island
Blake Island, Antigua and Barbuda
Cinnamon Island
Codrington Island
Crump Island
Dulcina Island
Exchange Island
Five Islands, Antigua and Barbuda
Great Bird Island, Antigua
Green Island, Antigua and Barbuda
Guana Island, Antigua and Barbuda
Hale Gate Island
Hawes Island
Henry Island
Johnson Island, Antigua and Barbuda
Kid Island
Laviscounts Island
Lobster Island
Long Island, Antigua
Maid Island
Moor Island
Nanny Island
Pelican Island, Antigua and Barbuda
Prickly Pear Island
Rabbit Island, Antigua
Rat Island, Antigua and Barbuda
Red Head Island
Redonda
Sandy Island, Antigua and Barbuda
Smith Island, Antigua and Barbuda
The Sisters, Antigua and Barbuda
Vernon Island
Wicked Will Island
York Island (Antigua and Barbuda)

L
Languages of Antigua and Barbuda
Law enforcement in Antigua and Barbuda
Leeward Islands
Lesser Antilles
LGBT rights in Antigua and Barbuda (Gay rights)
Lists related to Antigua and Barbuda:
Diplomatic missions of Antigua and Barbuda
List of airports in Antigua and Barbuda
List of Antigua and Barbuda-related topics
List of Antiguans and Barbudans
List of birds of Antigua and Barbuda
List of diplomatic missions in Antigua and Barbuda
List of football clubs in Antigua and Barbuda
List of islands of Antigua and Barbuda
List of mammals of Antigua and Barbuda
List of newspapers in Antigua and Barbuda
List of political parties in Antigua and Barbuda
List of rivers of Antigua and Barbuda
List of schools in Antigua and Barbuda

M
Mammals of Antigua and Barbuda
Military history of Antigua and Barbuda
Military of Antigua and Barbuda
Monarchy of Antigua and Barbuda
Music of Antigua and Barbuda

N
National anthem of Antigua and Barbuda
Navy of Antigua and Barbuda
North America
Northern Hemisphere

O
Office of the Ombudsman (Antigua and Barbuda)
Organisation of Eastern Caribbean States (OECS)

P
Politics of Antigua and Barbuda
List of political parties in Antigua and Barbuda
Prime Minister of Antigua and Barbuda
Prominent Antiguans and Barbudans

R
Racer Snake
Religion in Antigua and Barbuda
Revenue stamps of Antigua
Richie Richardson
Rivers of Antigua and Barbuda
Andy Roberts
Romantic Rhythms Music Festival
Rugby union in Antigua and Barbuda

S
Saint John's on Antigua – Capital of Antigua and Barbuda
Senate of Antigua and Barbuda
St. John's Cathedral, St. John's
Sir Vivian Richards Cricket Grounds
Stanford 20/20
Shermain Jeremy

T
Topic outline of Antigua and Barbuda
Transport in Antigua and Barbuda

U
United Nations, member state since 1981
United States-Antigua and Barbuda relations

V
VC Bird International Airport
Viv Richards
Visa policy of Antigua and Barbuda

W
West Indies
Western Hemisphere

Wikipedia:WikiProject Topic outline/Drafts/Topic outline of Antigua and Barbuda

See also

List of Caribbean-related topics
List of international rankings
Lists of country-related topics
Outline of Antigua and Barbuda

References

External links

 
Indexes of topics by country